Darreh Deraz-e Chin (also Romanized as Darreh Derāz-e Chīn; also known as Darreh Derāz) is a village in Chin Rural District, Ludab District, Boyer-Ahmad County, Kohgiluyeh and Boyer-Ahmad Province, Iran. At the 2006 census, its population was 251, in 49 families.

References 

Populated places in Boyer-Ahmad County